Park Hills is a city in St. Francois County, Missouri, United States. The population was 8,587 at the 2020 census.

History
The city was formed in an unusual four-way merger that took place in January 1994, in which the cities of Flat River, Elvins, Esther and the village of Rivermines joined to form the new city of Park Hills.  The formerly incorporated village of Fairview Acres had previously merged with Flat River on November 8, 1983. The name of the new city was selected by entries submitted to a committee made up of citizens of the four cities. The name Park Hills was submitted by Mildred Lee, a lifelong resident and a former teacher of Flat River. The inspiration came from its hilly terrain in the foothills of the Ozark Mountains and the many parks that surround the area. Park Hills is located 7 miles northwest of Farmington, Missouri and approximately 65 miles south of St. Louis. It is adjacent to St. Joe State Park, and nearby the state parks of St. Francois, Hawn, Elephant Rocks, Johnson's Shut-Ins, Taum Sauk Mountain, and Washington.

Park Hills is home to Mineral Area College, formerly known as Flat River Junior College. The town is located in the Old Lead Belt, formerly a large lead mining district.

The Eugene Field School was added to the National Register of Historic Places in 2005.

Geography
Park Hills is located at  (37.844538, -90.511038).

Demographics

2010 census
At the 2010 census there were 8,759 people, 3,551 households, and 2,154 families living in the city. The racial makeup of the city was 95.34% White, 1.96% Black or African American, 0.47% Native American, 0.41% Asian, 0.13% Native Hawaiian or Pacific Islander, 0.25% from other races, and 1.44% from two or more races. Hispanic or Latino of any race were 1.27%.

Of the 3,551 households 35.3% had children under the age of 18 living with them, 38.7% were married couples living together, 15.8% had a female householder with no husband present, 6.1% had a male householder with no wife present, and 39.3% were non-families. 31.1% of households were one person and 11% were one person aged 65 or older. The average household size was 2.44 and the average family size was 3.04.

The median age was 32.7 years. 26.2% of residents were under the age of 18; 12.1% were between the ages of 18 and 24; 26.8% were from 25 to 44; 23.2% were from 45 to 64; and 11.7% were 65 or older. The gender makeup of the city was 48.4% male and 51.6% female.

2000 census
At the 2000 census there were 7,861 people, 3,181 households, and 2,070 families living in the city. The population density was 392.5 people per square mile (151.5/km). There were 3,520 housing units at an average density of 175.7 per square mile (67.9/km).  The racial makeup of the city was 97.62% White, 0.32% African American, 0.27% Native American, 0.45% Asian, 0.03% Pacific Islander, 0.41% from other races, and 0.92% from two or more races. Hispanic or Latino of any race were 0.92%.

Of the 3,181 households 32.3% had children under the age of 18 living with them, 45.5% were married couples living together, 15.3% had a female householder with no husband present, and 34.9% were non-families. 28.7% of households were one person and 12.5% were one person aged 65 or older. The average household size was 2.45 and the average family size was 2.99.

The age distribution was 26.6% under the age of 18, 11.2% from 18 to 24, 29.1% from 25 to 44, 19.6% from 45 to 64, and 13.5% 65 or older. The median age was 34 years. For every 100 females there were 89.6 males. For every 100 females age 18 and over, there were 85.0 males.

The median household income was $25,277 and the median family income was $30,663. Males had a median income of $26,900 versus $17,613 for females. The per capita income for the city was $13,048. About 17.6% of families and 21.1% of the population were below the poverty line, including 28.8% of those under age 18 and 12.2% of those age 65 or over.

Education
Public education in Park Hills is administered by Central R-III School District.

Park Hills has a lending library, the Park Hills Public Library.

Arts and culture
Some of the many places that bring people to Park Hills Missouri include Columbia Park located in the center of the city and includes a walking track, playground, an 18-hole disc golf course, and the Park Hills public pool, Park Hills Sports Complex which is home to many softball games; opening in March and closing in November.

Notable people
 Darrell S. Cole, Medal of Honor recipient and namesake of USS Cole (DDG-67)
 Ferlin Husky, country music singer, member of the Country Music Hall of Fame
 Bill Upton, Major League Baseball player
 Tom Upton, Major League Baseball player

References

External links
 Historic maps of Elvins and Park Hill in the Sanborn Maps of Missouri Collection at the University of Missouri

Cities in St. Francois County, Missouri
Cities in Missouri